Niari, also known as "Radhi", is a caste in Odisha know for their traditional work "Chudakuta" (making flattened rice) and "Muudikuta" (making puffed rice). They're  subcaste of Kshatriya.They are belong to general caste.

History 
In history a group of unemployed and poor people mostly of the Niari Caste, and few other caste, adopted a profession, usually preparing flattened rice. It also has been offering to god as prsad.

References

Indian castes
Fishing communities in India
Fishing castes